The Roman Catholic Parish of the Exaltation of the Holy Cross (Czech: Římskokatolická farnost Povýšení svatého Kříže) is Roman Catholic parish in Prostějov, Moravia. The exact year of foundation of the parish is not known. It is estimated the period before 1200. Parish unites Catholic believers in Prostějov and cares for their spiritual needs.

History 
The first known spiritual administrator in the history of the parish was Jakub (first mentioned in 1383). In 1391 there was founded augustinian monastery by Peter of Kravare. All churches in Prostějov were transferred to the authority of the new monastery. The monastery was burned by Hussites in 1430. Augustinians and other Catholic burghers fled to Olomouc. Parish was led by Hussite and Protestant priests since 1522 to recatholization in 1622.

Pastors 
 1383 Jakub, plebanus
 1405 Jan I., first provost of Prostějov
 1406 Jakub I., provost
 1430 Marek, provost 
 1437 Sigmund, provost
 1459 Adam, provost
 1481 Václav (Venceslaus de Cracovia), provost
 1489 Jakub Wyznar de longa villa, called Jakub II., provost
 1494 Jan Šťávka, provost
 1507 Jan II., administrator

Non-Catholic period (1522–1622) 
 1545 Jan Zahrádka
 Jan Klenovský
 Jiřík
 Jan Charpa
 Jan
 1560 Jan Maruin 
 Matouš Brodský (Matheus Brodenus), dean
 1572 Martin Kožišský
 1575 Šimon
 1576 Jan Klenovský
 1577 Jan Adelfus
 1585 Jakub Volenský
 1586 Lukáš Vranovský
 1587 Martin Boleslavský
 Jakub Melissaeus (Jan Krtský)
 1585 Martin Rychnovský
 1596 Martin Svorcius Rychnovský
 1609 Jiří Dikast z Miřkova
 1613 Ondřej Dubnický (Dubenius)
 1618 Jiřík Pivinský
 Jan Dobromělický

Catholic administration (1622–present) 
 1622 Jan Gottfried Hlaušek O.Praem 
 1625 Václav Jaich, SJ
 1633 Michal Prokop (Prokopius)
 1639 Jakub Vavřinec Capricius (Kozílek)
 1663 Ignác z Ditrichšteina
 Jiří František Polentaria
 Václav Koutný
 1664 Jiří Jan Wagner
 1689 Jan Jakub Hofman
 1688 František Ondřej of Mensdorf
 1691 Martin Čimel (Czmela)
 1695 Jiří Sigmund Hoffmann
 1703 František Xaver Leffler
 1709 Matěj Vejvoda
 1717 Jan Bernard Lev Rothe
 1720 Ferdinand Leopold Josef Bartodějský of Bartoděje
 1730 Jan Birhel
 1756 Bílovský
 1749 Josef Frimmel 
 1759 Matouš Koppil 
 1761 Antonín Zillich 
 1765 Gabriel Finbinger
 1787 František Keller
 1810 Ignác Kirchner
 1819 Josef Seeliger
 1847 Jan Humdsfeld
 1852 Josef Malý
 1863 Josef Novák
 1894 Ludvík Hofmann
 1904 Karel Dostál-Lutinov
 1923 Ignác Dragoun
 1963 Vojtěch Cikryt
 1990 Jan Gacík S.D.B.
 1995 František Ptáček S.D.B.
 2000 Pavel Krejčí S.D.B.
 2006 Dan Žůrek S.D.B.
 2013 Leo Červenka S.D.B.
 2016 Aleš Vrzala

Churches 
 Parish Church of the Exaltation of the Holy Cross, Prostějov
 Filial Church of Saints Cyril and Methodius 
 Filial Church of Saint Joseph 
 Holy Trinity Chapel
 Chapel of Saint Anna 
 Chapel of Guardian Angels

References 

Content in this edit is translated from the existing Czech Wikipedia article at cz:Římskokatolická farnost Povýšení svatého Kříže Prostějov; see its history for attribution.

Parishes of the Catholic Church
Buildings and structures in Prostějov
Church parishes in Europe